Romeo is the second EP by South Korean boy group Shinee. It was released on May 25, 2009, in South Korea under the seal of the label SM Entertainment. The EP consists of six tracks including the title song "Juliette" and is Shinee's first Korean release after a seven-month hiatus. On August 29, 2011, a Japanese version of "Juliette" was released as Shinee's second Japanese single with the original Japanese song "Kiss Kiss Kiss" as a B-side. The release peaked at number three on the weekly Oricon chart.

The album was commercially successful in South Korea—it topped the Hanteo Album Chart for three consecutive weeks. However, there are no known cumulative chart records for albums sold in 2009. Prior to the establishment of the Gaon Music Chart in 2010, South Korea's music charts were supplied by the Music Industry Association of Korea (MIAK), which stopped compiling data in 2008. According to Gaon, the EP has sold over 20,000 copies since 2011.

Background and release
Romeo was Shinee's first Korean release since the reissue Amigo on October 31, 2008. The EP was originally scheduled for release on May 21 but was delayed to May 25 due to Onew damaging his teeth. The choreography for the title song is the work of Rino Nakasone, who also choreographed previous Shinee songs such as "Replay" and "Love Like Oxygen". The lead single "Juliette" is a remake of "Deal with It" by Jay Sean and Corbin Bleu. Executives at SM Entertainment bought the rights to the song from Hollywood Records. The song was slightly re-arranged by Cutfather and, as the original song's lyrics were not purchased, the Korean lyrics were penned by Shinee members Jonghyun and Minho. On May 22, the group started their official promotions and performed the title song for the first time on Music Bank. The Korean music video was released on May 22 and features f(x)'s Krystal as the female lead, while the song's Japanese music video features actress Go Ara. The Korean music video was shot in early May in Seoul and Ilsanseo-gu and was directed by Lee Sang-kyu.

Concept and composition

The album concept was inspired by William Shakespeare's tragedy Romeo and Juliet. The band members portray the Romeo of the 21st century, confessing their love to their Juliet. The album consists of six tracks, and songwriters such as Kenzie, Young-hu Kim, Jung Yeop and Eco Bridge participated in their composition. Two of the six songs are named after Romeo and Juliet—the title song "Juliette" and the last track on the album, "Romeo + Juliette". The title track, which is described as an urban dance song with "sophisticated" rhythm and acoustic drums, is written by Jonghyun, who took on the job of writing lyrics for the first time since debut. He stated that after listening to the demo of the title track he went to look for a romance story that "will make everyone interested but also a story which everyone can identify with" and was inspired by the classic movie Romeo and Juliet.

SM's creative director Min Hee-jin, who had worked with the group since the beginning, called Romeo a turning point for the group, visually as well as musically, saying, "The visualisation of the album reflected their identity the best. I aimed to put the group's signature colour (pearl aqua) on the map, as well as each member's individual style." In the music video for the title song "Juliette", the members wear bright clothes and clashing accessories to accentuate their youthfulness.

Track listing

Accolades

Release history

References

2009 EPs
SM Entertainment EPs
Korean-language EPs
Shinee EPs